Elsfield is an English village and civil parish about  northeast of the centre of Oxford. For relative reference purposes, the Oxford alluvial flood plain is at 60 metres above sea level.

Parish church
The chancel arch  of the Church of England parish church dates from at least the latter part of the 12th century. The church formerly had a north aisle that may also have dated from this period. There is a canonical sundial on the south wall. In about 1273 the church was remodelled and rededicated to St Thomas of Canterbury. The Decorated Gothic east window was added in about the 14th century. Either side of the south doorway are two Perpendicular Gothic windows that were added in about the 15th century. The pulpit is Jacobean.

In 1849 the church was heavily restored in an Early English Gothic style. Until then, the blocked arcade of the north aisle was visible in the north wall of the nave. During the restoration the arcade seems to have been removed; there are 12th-century capitals in the Vicarage garden that may have come from it. The floor and seating were renewed in 1859 under the direction of the Gothic Revival architect G.E. Street. In about 1860 a mosaic reredos by Salviati was added in the chancel.  St. Thomas's is a Grade II* listed building.

Notable inhabitants

The novelist John Buchan (Governor General of Canada, 1935-1940) lived at Elsfield Manor from 1919 until 1935. His ashes are buried in St Thomas's churchyard.  Trump, the originator of the Jack Russell Terrier dog breed, is said to have come from Elsfield or nearby Marston.

References

Sources and further reading

External links

Villages in Oxfordshire
Civil parishes in Oxfordshire